WNPZ (1580 AM) is a radio station serving the Knoxville Metropolitan Area with an Urban Adult Contemporary/Gospel music format. The station is licensed to Metropolitan Management Corporation of Tennessee.

WNPZ's license was canceled on June 20, 2017 for not paying debts it owed to the Federal Communications Commission (FCC), which prevented the renewal of the station's license.

On July 24, 2017, WNPZ filed a Petition for Reconsideration. The station's license was reinstated by the FCC on June 6, 2019.

References

External links

NPZ
Radio stations established in 1961
Urban adult contemporary radio stations in the United States
Gospel radio stations in the United States
1961 establishments in Tennessee
NPZ